John Moffat may refer to:
John Alston Moffat (1825–1904), Canadian entomologist
John Moffat (physicist) (born 1932), professor and physicist
John Keith Moffat (born 1943), professor and biophysicist at the University of Chicago
John Moffat (missionary) (1835–1918), British missionary and imperial agent in southern Africa
John Moffat (mining pioneer) (1841–1918), Scottish-born mining entrepreneur in Australia
John Moffat (Royal Navy officer) (1919–2016), Royal Navy Fleet Air Arm pilot
John Moffatt (actor) (1922–2012), English actor and playwright

See also
John Moffatt (disambiguation)
John Moffet (disambiguation)